Gaumer's spiny pocket mouse (Heteromys gaumeri) is a species of rodent in the family Heteromyidae. It ranges over northern Belize and Guatemala and the Yucatán Peninsula of Mexico, where it lives in lowland semideciduous forest and thorn scrub. The species is nocturnal and terrestrial; it is solitary and strongly territorial. It is named after physician and biologist George F. Gaumer, who lived in the Yucatán from 1885 to 1929.

References

Heteromys
Mammals of Mexico
Mammals described in 1897
Taxonomy articles created by Polbot